Heliscus tropicus is a Betsy beetle of the Family Passalidae.

References 

Passalidae